Victoria Mérida Rojas (born 4 July 1959), better known as Victoria Abril, is a Spanish film actress and singer based in France. She is possibly best known to international audiences for her performance in the film Tie Me Up! Tie Me Down! by director Pedro Almodóvar.

Life and career
Born in Malaga, Abril became widely known in Spain in 1976 when she appeared  in the show Un, dos, tres... responda otra vez for two years. In addition to working in Spain, she has made films in France, Italy, and Iceland. She has been nominated eight times for Goya Awards in the Lead Actress category and has won once. She also won the Silver Bear for Best Actress at the 41st Berlin International Film Festival for her role in Amantes. Two years later, she was awarded with the Berlinale Camera at the 43rd Berlin International Film Festival.

Abril is also a singer. In 2005, she made her debut with a bossanova-jazz album called PutchEros do Brasil. She also tried to represent Spain in the Eurovision Song Contest 1979 with "Bang-Bang-Bang", but Betty Missiego was chosen instead.

Personal life
On 28 July 1977, Victoria Abril married Gustavo Laube, former footballer of the Chile national football team. The couple separated in early 1982. 

Victoria Abril has two sons with the French director Gérard de Battista. She lives in France, where she has resided since 1982.

Filmography

References

External links

Official Website of Victoria Abril
Victoria Abril  at Allmovie

1959 births
Living people
Actresses from Madrid
Singers from Madrid
Spanish film actresses
Bossa nova singers
European Film Awards winners (people)
Best Actress Goya Award winners
Spanish women singers
Spanish jazz singers
Spanish expatriates in France
French-language singers of Spain
Portuguese-language singers of Spain
English-language singers from Spain
Italian-language singers of Spain
Silver Bear for Best Actress winners
20th-century Spanish actresses
21st-century Spanish actresses
Chicas Almodóvar